Vitalii Gritsenko (born 16 December 1985) is a Russian wheelchair racer in the T53 classification. He represented Russian Paralympic Committee athletes at the 2020 Summer Paralympics.

Career
Gritsenko represented Russian Paralympic Committee athletes at the 2020 Summer Paralympics in the 400 m T53 event and won a bronze medal.

References

Living people
1985 births
Medalists at the World Para Athletics European Championships
Athletes (track and field) at the 2020 Summer Paralympics
Medalists at the 2020 Summer Paralympics
Paralympic medalists in athletics (track and field)
Paralympic bronze medalists for the Russian Paralympic Committee athletes
21st-century Russian people